The 1997–98 Pro Tour season was the third season of the Magic: The Gathering Pro Tour. It began on 30 August 1997 with Grand Prix Toronto, and ended on 16 August 1998 with the conclusion of 1998 World Championship in Seattle. The season consisted of thirteen Grand Prix, and five Pro Tours, located in Chicago, Mainz, Los Angeles, New York, and Seattle. At the end of the season Jon Finkel from the United States was awarded the Pro Player of the Year title.

Grand Prix – Toronto, Copenhagen 

GP Toronto (30–31 August)

GP Copenhagen (6–7 September)

Pro Tour – Chicago (10–12 October 1997) 

Attending a Pro Tour for the first time, Randy Buehler defeated David Mills in the finals to win the inaugural Pro Tour of the 1997–98 season. Olle Råde's final eight appearance made him the first player to reach the Top 8 four times.

Tournament data 
Prize pool: $151,635
Players: 324
Format: Extended

Final standings

Grand Prix – Como 

GP Como (8–9 November)

Pro Tour – Mainz (5–7 December 1997) 

Eventual Pro Player of the year Paul McCabe won Pro Tour Dallas. The Canadian defeated Jason Zila from the US in the final. Olle Råde had his third Top 8 appearance while playing only his fourth Pro Tour.

Tournament data 
Prize pool: $151,635
Players: 291
Format: Rochester Draft (Tempest)

Final standings

Grand Prix – San Francisco, Madrid, Rio de Janeiro, Lyon, Melbourne 

GP San Francisco (6–7 December)
 Robert Swarowski
 Ryan Fuller
 Steve Shears
 Brett Quorn
 Daniel Clegg
 Steve Aldrich
 Ernest Alexander
 Casey McCarrel

GP Lyon (7–8 February)
 Raphaël Lévy
 Kurt Foket
 Manuel Bevand
 Michaël Debard
 Emmanuel Beltrando
 Loïc Degrou
 Nicolas Lacorne
 Laurent Laclaverie

GP Madrid (24–25 January)
 Steven O'Mahoney-Schwartz
 Michaël Debard
 Jérémie Lagarde
 Herve Drevillon
 Christian Celades
 Omar Sagol
 Gabriele Pisicchio
 Marc Iglesias

GP Melbourne (14–15 February)
 Philip Davey
 Matt Goodall
 Lenny Collins
 Craig Sheppard
 Daniel Turner
 Adam Kemp
 Kevin Cheng
 Andrew Corney

GP Rio de Janeiro (31 January – 1 February)
 Jon Finkel
 Steven O'Mahoney-Schwartz
 Carlos Jeucken
 Adam Katz
 Leandro Buck
 Romario Tavora Britto
 Rodrigo Cesar Barbosa
 Julio Cesar Conceicao

Pro Tour – Los Angeles (6–8 March 1998) 

David Price won Pro Tour Los Angeles. In the finals he defeated Ben Rubin, who thus made it to the second place at his first Pro Tour attendance.

Tournament data 

Prize pool: $151,635
Players: 342
Format: Block Constructed (Tempest)

Final standings

Grand Prix – Stockholm 

GP Stockholm (21–22 March)
 Olle Råde
 Tuomo Nieminen
 Johan Franzen
 Jan Pieter Groenhof
 Manuel Bevand
 Viktor Forsman
 Ole Bergesen
 Sigurd Eskeland

Pro Tour – New York (17–19 April 1998) 

In an all-American Top 8 Jon Finkel won his first Pro Tour. Mark Justice reached his fourth and as yet last final eight.

Tournament data 

Prize pool: $151,635
Format: Booster Draft (Tempest-Stronghold)

Top 8

Final standings

Grand Prix – Atlanta, Antwerp, Zurich, Indianapolis

GP Atlanta (27–28 March)
 Randy Buehler
 Bob Coonce
 David Mills
 Derek Rank
 Patrick Callahan
 Ray Deguzman
 Nate Clark
 Chris Donahue

GP Indianapolis (27–28 June)
 Eric Jordan
 Koby Kennison
 Michael Chiumento
 Worth Wollpert
 Randy Buehler
 Michael Katz
 Ryan Joe
 Darwin Kastle

GP Antwerp (25–26 April)
 Stephan Valkyser
 Lukas Ladra
 Brian Hacker
 Michael Sochon
 Randy Buehler
 Timo Meimberg
 Peer Kröger
 Michaël Debard

GP Zurich (30–31 May)
 Steven O'Mahoney-Schwartz
 Rudy Edwards
 Michaël Debard
 Alexander Blumke
 Janosch Kühn
 Jon Finkel
 Marcel Baran
 Michael Huth

1998 World Championships – Seattle (12–16 August 1998) 

Brian Selden defeated fellow American Ben Rubin to become the 1998 World Champion. The Top 8 was one of the most star-studded final eights ever, with all players making at least one other Top 8 appearance, and four of them later becoming Hall of Famers.

The US national team, consisting of Matt Linde, Mike Long, Bryce Currence, and Jon Finkel won its third team title. Long thus won his third team title, too, as he had been precisely on those teams which had won the title.

Tournament data 

Players: 203
Format: Standard, Rochester Draft (Mirage-Visions-Weatherlight), Extended
Individual formats: Booster Draft (Tempest-Stronghold-Exodus), Standard, Tempest Block Constructed (Tempest, Stronghold, Exodus)
Team formats: 4-Person Team Sealed (4 5th Edition Starter + 4 5th Edition Booster) – Swiss; Constructed (2x Tempest Block Constructed + 2x Standard) – Finals

Top 8

Final standings

National team competition 

 United States (Matt Linde, Mike Long, Bryce Currence, Jon Finkel)
 France (Pierre Malherbaud, Manuel Bevand, Marc Hernandez, Fabien Demazeau)

Pro Player of the year final standings 

After the World Championship Jon Finkel was awarded the Pro Player of the year title.

References 

Magic: The Gathering professional events